Chaceon fenneri, commonly known as the golden crab or golden deepsea crab, is one of several species of crab harvested for food by humans. It was formerly called Geryon fenneri. Like the blue crab, its common name comes from the color of its shell; it is usually cream to tan in color. It cannot swim. Its diet includes benthic (bottom-dwelling) organisms like mollusks and worms.

References

External links
South Atlantic Fishery Management Council

Portunoidea
Edible crustaceans
Commercial crustaceans
Crustaceans of the Atlantic Ocean
Crustaceans described in 1984
Taxa named by Raymond B. Manning